Rachid Ghaflaoui (Arabic: رشيد الغفلاوي; born January 1, 1973) is a Moroccan football coach. He is the current coach of the Libyan club Al Ta'awon SC which plays in the Libyan Championship.

Career
Born in Marrakech in Morocco, Ghaflaoui was appointed in 2014 as coach of Nigerien club Sahel SC, before joining Congolese club Sanga Balende in February 2016, which he managed to qualify for the Confederation Cup by finishing third place of the Congolese champion.

In November 2017, he re-signed with the Nigerien club Sahel SC, a club with which he won the country's Cup and Supercup during the same season, before signing with the Ivorian club Williamsville Athletic Club the following season.

In 2020, he joined the Guinean club Académie SOAR, then in 2021, the Bahraini club Bahrain SC with which he will achieve the promotion to the Bahraini Premier League.

Honours 
Niger Cup: 2017
Niger Super Cup: 2017
Champion of Bahraini Second Division: 2022

References

Moroccan football managers
Moroccan expatriate football managers
Association football coaches
1973 births
Living people